Linda A. McCauley is an American scientist and academic administrator. She is dean of the Nell Hodgson Woodruff School of Nursing at Emory University. She was a professor of nursing and associate dean of research at University of Pennsylvania School of Nursing.

Education 
McCauley completed a B.S.N. from University of North Carolina at Chapel Hill. She earned a master's in nursing from Emory University. She completed a doctorate in environmental health at University of Cincinnati.

Career 
McCauley had an academic appointment at University of Cincinnati. She was a scientist in the Center for Research on Occupational and Environmental Toxicology (CROET) and a professor of nursing in the family and community health division at  Oregon Health & Science University. McCauley joined University of Pennsylvania School of Nursing in 2003 as associate dean of research and a professor of nursing. She had administrative responsibilities including the research initiatives and policy making and oversight. She became dean of the Nell Hodgson Woodruff School of Nursing at Emory University in May 2009. McCauley is experienced in nursing education and researches the impact of environmental exposures and health hazards on vulnerable populations such as workers and young children.

Awards and honors 
McCauley is a fellow of the American Association of Occupational Health Nurses and the American Academy of Nursing.

References 

Fellows of the American Academy of Nursing
UNC School of Nursing alumni
Emory University alumni
University of Cincinnati alumni
University of Cincinnati faculty
Emory University faculty
Oregon Health & Science University faculty
University of Pennsylvania faculty
20th-century American scientists
21st-century American scientists
20th-century American women scientists
21st-century American women scientists
American nurses
American women nurses
Nursing school deans
American university and college faculty deans
Women deans (academic)
Living people
Place of birth missing (living people)
Year of birth missing (living people)
American women academics
Members of the National Academy of Medicine